Yong Hye-in (Korean: 용혜인, born 12 April 1990) is a South Korean civil society activist and politician of the Basic Income Party. She was one of the main proponents of the silent march campaign, Stay Where You Are, that originated in an announcement made during the Sinking of MV Sewol in 2014.

Political career
On 23 May 2021, Yong became the third sitting lawmaker in South Korean history to give birth while being a lawmaker. Since the birth of her child, Yong had been on maternity leave from Parliament; temporarily substituted while in absence by Basic Income Party leader Shin Ji-hye.

Yong returned to Parliament on 5 June 2021.

Election results

General elections

See also 
 Arbeit Workers Union
 Koo Kyo-hyun

References

References

External links 
 Yong Hye-in's website 
  
  

1990 births
Living people
People from Bucheon
Universal basic income activists
New Progressive Party (South Korea)
Labor Party (South Korea) politicians
South Korean left-wing activists
Members of the National Assembly (South Korea)
Kyung Hee University alumni